Room 13 may refer to:

Books
Room 13 (Wallace novel), 1924 first of the Mr. Reeder detective stories
Room 13 (Swindells novel), children's novel

Film
Room 13 (film) (German Zimmer 13), 1964 West German adaption of the Wallace novel directed by Harald Reinl

Music
"Room 13", 1981 song by Black Flag from Damaged (Black Flag album)
"Room 13", 2007 song from Rise Above (Dirty Projectors album)

See also
Room 13 International